The 2016–17 BIBL, is the ninth edition of Balkan International Basketball League. It started on 10 October 2016.

Twelve teams joined the competition and were divided into two groups of six teams. Top four from each group will qualify for the second stage, where they will be divided into two groups of 4 teams. Winners of both group will qualify to the semifinals, while the runners-up and third-placed teams will qualify for the quarterfinals.

First stage

Group A

Group B

Second stage
In italics, results carried from the first stage.

Group C

Group D

Quarterfinals

Semifinals

Finals

References

External links
 Official website

2016-17
2016–17 in European basketball leagues
2016–17 in Kosovan basketball
2016–17 in Republic of Macedonia basketball
2016–17 in Bulgarian basketball
2016–17 in Montenegrin basketball
Basketball in Albania